Owen Casey (born 22 October 1969 in Dublin) is a former tennis player from Ireland.

Casey is a three-time tennis Olympian playing in Seoul '88, Barcelona '92 and Atlanta '96. The right-hander reached his highest singles ATP-ranking on 12 October 1992, when he became World Number 228. Casey won 33 of his 49 Davis Cup matches for Ireland. He runs a camp in Mountpleasant tennis club, Dublin.

References

External links
 
 

1969 births
Living people
Irish male tennis players
Olympic tennis players of Ireland
Tennis players from Dublin (city)
Tennis players at the 1992 Summer Olympics
Tennis players at the 1996 Summer Olympics
People educated at St Aidan's C.B.S.